Robert Kelker-Kelly (born April 18, 1964) is a former American soap opera actor and current professional aircraft pilot, best known for playing Bo Brady on the NBC soap opera Days of Our Lives from 1992 to 1995. He is also known for his portrayals of Sam Fowler (originating the role) from 1987 to 1990 and Dr. Shane Roberts from 1996 to 1998 on Another World, and for the role of Stavros Cassadine on General Hospital from 2001 to 2003 and 2013 to 2014.

Early life
He was born to Jonetta Kelker, a nurse, and Robert Kelly, a pathologist. He has 3 sisters. His parents divorced when he was 7 years old, and he moved in with his dad. At 11, when his father remarried, Kelker-Kelly, moved back with his mother. Three months later his dad died at 42 from a heart attack.

Kelker-Kelly attended Wichita Collegiate School in Wichita, Kansas from 1977 to 1980, where he was active in the theatre and had major roles in several plays, including Rusty in Guys and Dolls, Bill Sikes in Oliver! and Sir Lionel in Camelot. He briefly attended the University of Kansas but decided to forgo college in favor of pursuing his acting career. In 1988, he married Linda Rattner; the couple divorced in 1992.

After dating actress Miriam Parrish for years, the couple married in 1997. The same year he left Los Angeles and his acting career briefly behind. He earned a certification in airframe and powerplant mechanics. From 2002 to 2003 he was an acting teacher at the Pioneer Valley Performing Arts Charter Public School in South Hadley, Massachusetts.

Kelker-Kelly became a professional pilot, working in that field from 2003 to 2015. He is type rated in the GIV, LR60, LR45, CE560 and CE500. He is still an active pilot and teaches people how to fly.

Career
Kelker made his acting debut in 1987 as Sam Fowler on the soap opera Another World, a role he originally played from 1987 to 1990. The character of Sam was involved in a front-burner story with socialite Amanda Cory.

In 1992, Kelker-Kelly was chosen to portray Bo Brady, an established role on Days of Our Lives that was being vacated by the creator of the role, actor Peter Reckell. Although Kelker-Kelly was a recast, fans accepted his portrayal of Bo. The character's pairing with Hope Brady (Kristian Alfonso) and reformed bad girl Billie Reed (Lisa Rinna) was a popular storyline and garnered Kelker-Kelly his widest audience. He was replaced by Peter Reckell in August 1995. In 1996 he returned to Another World playing a new role, that of professional race car driver Bobby Reno, who was later discovered to actually be Dr. Shane Roberts. He played the role until 1998.

He portrayed Stavros Cassadine on General Hospital in 2001, with guest spots in 2002, 2003, 2013 and 2014.

Select filmography
 2001–03, 2013–14: General Hospital as Stavros Cassadine 
 1999: Rescue 77 (episode "Career Day"; 1999)
 1996: Dream for an Insomniac as Trent
 1995: Maybe This Time (episode "Julia's Day Off; 1995)
 1995: Touched by an Angel as Matt Duncan
 1992–95: Days of Our Lives as Bo Brady
 1987–90: Another World as Sam Fowler
 1996–98: Another World Shane Roberts / Bobby Reno
 1992: Jack's Place (TV series) (episode "I See Cupid, I See France"; 1992)

References

External links
Stavros Cassadine character profile from SoapCentral
Bo Brady character profile from SoapCentral

1964 births
Living people
American male soap opera actors
American male television actors
Male actors from Kansas
People from Wichita, Kansas